International Indian School Dammam (IISD) (formerly Indian Embassy School Dammam) is an English-medium K-12 Indian school in Saudi Arabia led by Mahenaz Farid. It is the largest school in the MENA region by number of students. Most of its 14000+ students come from in and around Ad-Dammam, Al-Khobar, Abqaiq, Al Qatif, Al-Hofuf, and Ras tanura. The School is part of Global International Indian Schools which consists of 10 schools, most notably including including International Indian School, Riyadh, International Indian School Jeddah, International Indian School Jubail, International Indian School Taif, International Indian School Tabuk, International Indian School Buraidah.

About
The school was established in 10 October 1982 with 250 students and 15 teachers in a few portable cabins and inaugurated by the then Indian Prime Minister Indira Gandhi. In 2006, it was divided into two separate buildings, with separate campuses for girls and boys, at a total 9.8 acres.

In 2022, the school has 14,585 students, over 750 teachers, 38 administrative staff, and 75 janitorial staff on hire from a local contractor. It has a fleet of 70 buses on hire from a private company. It is affiliated to the Central Board of Secondary Education and has three streams – Arts, Science and Commerce.

The Ambassador of India is the patron of IIS Dammam. The school is governed by a Managing Committee which lays down broad policies and guidelines, leaving the principal and staff to conduct day-to-day affairs.

Members of the School Managing Committee        
 Moazzam Dadan(Chairman) 
 Syed Mohammad Firoz Ashraf                    
 Shabash Khasim
 Misbahullah Ansari (first alumnus in school history to be a member)
 Sadia Irfan Khan 
 Sanoj Gopalakrishna Pillai

References

External links
 International Indian School Dammam

Further reading
 

Educational institutions established in 1982
Indian international schools in Saudi Arabia
1982 establishments in Saudi Arabia
Education in Dammam